Cavankerry Press is an American nonprofit literary press located in Fort Lee, New Jersey, which publishes poetry and nonfiction. Cavankerry Press is a member of the Council of Literary Magazines and Presses, has thrice received a Citation of Excellence from the New Jersey Arts Council honoring New Jersey arts organizations, and was a finalist for the 2017 AWP Small Press Publisher Award. 

Some notable authors published by Cavankerry Press include Ross Gay, Mary Ruefle, Robert Cording, January Gill O'Neil, Maureen Seaton, Joseph O. Legaspi, Baron Wormser, Jeanne Marie Beaumont, Christopher Bursk, and Paola Corso.
Cavankerry Press titles have been reviewed in Publishers Weekly,  Women’s Review of Books, Mom Egg Review, The Rumpus, Cutbank, and other publications; and the press has been featured in articles in The New York Times and Poets & Writers.

The press publishes five to six books a year by emerging, mid-career and established poets, memoirs with the theme "Lives Brought to Life," and collections of poetry and prose exploring "serious physical and/or psychological illness," and seeks manuscripts “from the broadest range of writers, including people of color and people with disabilities.” The press is run by founding publisher, senior editor, and clinical psychologist, Joan Cusack Handler, who is also the author of three poetry collections.  Cavankerry Press titles are distributed by University of Chicago Press. The press has received support from New Jersey State Council on the Arts, the Gold Foundation, and other organizations.

References

Sources 
Cavankerry Press Website, Various Pages
Poets & Writers | Small Presses
Amazon Books | Advanced Search| Cavankerry Press | Featured Titles

External links 
 Cavankerry Press Home Page
 University of Chicago Press | Titles by Publisher
 Council of Literary Magazines and Small Presses | Directory of Member Publishers
 Article on Cavankerry Press | Poets & Writers | News & Trends | Poetry for Patients and Their Families | by Beth Cranwell Alpin | March/April 2013
 Article on  Cavankerry Press | The New York Times | The Next Small Thing by Robert Strauss | July 10, 2005

Book publishing companies based in New Jersey
 Non-profit organizations based in New Jersey
New Jersey culture
Fort Lee, New Jersey